Michael Jonathan Pagel (born September 13, 1960) is a former professional American football player who was selected by the Baltimore Colts in the fourth round of the 1982 NFL Draft. A 6'2",  quarterback from Arizona State, Pagel played in 12 NFL seasons from 1982–1993.

Drafted the same year as Art Schlichter, Pagel was drafted to be groomed as a backup.  Generally he out-played Schlichter.  Pagel bounced in and out of the starting quarterback job for the Colts in his four seasons with the team, alternating with Schlichter, Matt Kofler, and Mark Herrmann. He was the last Colt to wear #18 before Peyton Manning.  He was traded to Cleveland for the 1986 season and served for the next five years there strictly as a backup. In 1988, he took over for an injured Bernie Kosar and Don Strock and  played well in a playoff loss to the Houston Oilers.

Pagel finished up the last three years with the Los Angeles Rams, never garnering more than mop-up duties.

Pagel now resides in suburban Cleveland, Ohio, and is a project manager for AT&T.  He also serves as analyst for the pregame, halftime and postgame shows on WTAM and WMMS during Browns games and offers television color commentary on college games on Fox Sports Network. Pagel also provides video commentary on his own site Pagel On Point. In addition, he presently is the quarterback coach at Normandy High School in Parma, Ohio. Sports is part of the family bloodline; Mike's brother Karl Pagel played baseball for the Chicago Cubs and Cleveland Indians. His brother Rick was a starting defensive end for the United States Naval Academy and served over 20 years as a helicopter pilot in the Marine Corps. Two of his other brothers also played junior college sports.  His brother, Bruce, played offensive line at Glendale (AZ) Community College, and is now a professor of political science at Santa Fe College.  His brother, Ross, played quarterback for Phoenix College, and later played first base for the college baseball team. Washington High School in Phoenix Arizona named their football field after Mike Pagel.

References

1960 births
Living people
People from Douglas, Arizona
Baseball players from Arizona
Arizona State Sun Devils baseball players
Players of American football from Arizona
American football quarterbacks
Arizona State Sun Devils football players
Baltimore Colts players
Indianapolis Colts players
Cleveland Browns players
Los Angeles Rams players
Massachusetts Marauders players